Poland A and B refers to the historical, political and cultural distinction between the western and the eastern part of the country, with Poland "A", west of the Vistula, being much more developed and having faster growth than Poland "B", east of the river. The General Secretary of the  Marek Kłoczko, said in his 2007 interview that the divisions are more spread out and forming three separate categories, Poland "A" is the metropolitan cities, Poland "B" is the rest of the country, and Poland "C" is the plains and the landscape parks east of the Vistula (Poland "Z", according to Kłoczko), which require a different treatment.

Reportedly, Poland's well-off cities are Warsaw, Gdańsk, Wrocław, and Poznań, and the ones struggling with less investment are in the east: Rzeszów, Lublin, Olsztyn and Białystok. However, current unemployment statistics for Poland in general fail to show that distinction and even indicate an opposite trend in recent years, with the northwest reporting rates of unemployment higher than east-central Poland. In 2014, among the highest in the nation were the Kuyavian-Pomeranian and West Pomeranian Voivodeships (compare the historic railroad map and the administrative map, right, with the 2014 unemployment map, from business portal eGospodarka.pl); while among the lowest in the country was the east-central Masovian Voivodeship.

Regions of Poland

Distinction 
The distinction is unofficial and in some ways oversimplified, but it is widely acknowledged and discussed in Poland.

Historically, the source of Poland "A" and "B" can be traced to the period of the partitions of Poland, and different policies of the partitioners, which resulted in a much larger industrial development of the Prussian partition, compared to the Austrian and Russian partitions (including the so-called eastern Kresy) where the imperial exploitation policies were rampant.

In this divide, it has to be noted that Poland's borders were changing over the centuries. They moved westward after 1945, to reflect the Poland of the Piasts and the Poland of Jagiellonians. For instance, Warsaw was initially a settlement in eastern Poland. When it became a capital city in the 16th century, and historically in the developed as a central part of the Kingdom of Poland (the Crown), later western-central part of the Commonwealth. Now is situated in the central-eastern part of it. The slower growing western provinces are often former German regions that were already densely populated and well-developed in terms of infrastructure and industry before 1945, now populated mostly by Poles from the former Eastern Polish regions. For example, the above-mentioned Olsztyn was part of Prussia since the times of the Teutonic Order.

Politics

The difference between Poland's "A" and "B" is particularly evident in the voting patterns of the two regions. During the 1990s, Poland "A" tended to favour the Democratic Left Alliance (Sojusz Lewicy Demokratycznej, or SLD), as a secular, socially liberal de facto successor in post-1989 politics to the former ruling party of the PRL. Poland "B" on the other hand voted either PSL or the Solidarity, both representing Christian-democratic values. The 2001 election was the only one when Poland A and B were not seen on the maps, as SLD won both in the east and the west of the country. Since circa 2005, Poland saw a realignment in its political system. Residents of Poland "A" have supported the liberal conservative party Civic Platform (PO). Residents of Poland "B" (excluding Warsaw), on the other hand, tend to support the national conservative Law and Justice party (PiS).

Gallery

In popular culture 
On 26 January 2016, the album Karabin by Maria Peszek was released. It includes the song "Polska A, B, C i D". A day later, the song was released as a single and it peaked at number one on the Polish Radio Three Chart.

Poland "B" is mentioned in the 2020 Polish horror film Nobody Sleeps in the Woods Tonight.

See also 
 List of Polish voivodeships by GRP
 Partitions of Poland
 Recovered Territories
 The global North-South divide, and similar socioeconomic divides in:
 Belgium
 Italy
 Mainland China
 Korea
 Taiwan
 the United States
 the United Kingdom
 Western Ukraine and Eastern Ukraine

References

Further reading
 Kozak M., Pyszkowski A., Szewczyk R. (red.) 2001, Słownik Rozwoju Regionalnego, PARR, Warszawa.
 Iwona Borkowska, Polska Polsce nierówna, Raport Polska.pl 2008-06-04. Internet Archive.
 Gazeta Wyborcza (1999) 'Polska A, B i C' (Poland A, B and C), August 4

Economic history of Poland
Geography of Poland
Electoral geography
Economic geography